The 2010 Southland Conference men's basketball tournament, a part of the 2009-10 NCAA Division I men's basketball season, took place March 10–13, 2010 at the Merrell Center in Katy, Texas.  The winner of the tournament received the Southland Conference's automatic bid to the 2010 NCAA Tournament.  Had the #1 seed Sam Houston State Bearkats not won the conference tournament, they would have received an automatic bid to the 2010 NIT.

Format
The top eight teams, regardless of divisional standing, receive a berth in the conference tournament. The championship game was broadcast nationally on ESPN2.

Bracket

Asterisk denotes game ended in overtime

References

External links
Southland website
2009 Southland Basketball Tournament website

Southland Conference men's basketball tournament
Tournament
Southland Conference men's basketball tournament
Southland Conference men's basketball tournament
Sports competitions in Katy, Texas
College basketball tournaments in Texas